Thomas Pfrang (born December 11, 1964) is a West German sprint canoer who competed in the late 1980s. He won a complete set of medals at the ICF Canoe Sprint World Championships with a gold (K-2 500 m: 1986), a silver (K-4 500 m: 1989), and a bronze (K-4 500 m: 1987).

Pfrang also finished fourth in the K-2 500 m event at the 1988 Summer Olympics in Seoul.
OWNER OF THE "SILBERNE LORBEERBLATT"

References

Sports-reference.com profile

1964 births
Canoeists at the 1988 Summer Olympics
German male canoeists
Living people
Olympic canoeists of West Germany
ICF Canoe Sprint World Championships medalists in kayak